Nick Lyons (born 1932) is a fly-fisherman and angler who wrote for several magazines, published several books, and began a publishing company called Lyons Press.

Early life 
Nick Lyons was born in Brooklyn, New York in 1932. He began fishing at the age of 6 at his grandfather's hotel, the Laurel House, in the Catskill Mountains. He graduated from the Wharton School at the University of Pennsylvania and then served in the United States Army. At the age of 21, he began fly fishing, a passion that would last for the rest of his life. In 1963, he earned a doctorate in English from the University of Michigan.

Teaching career
Following his graduation from the University of Michigan, Lyons began working at the University of Michigan as an English professor. He then accepted a position at Hunter College of the City University of New York (CUNY) as an English literature professor in 1961. At the same time, he worked as an editor at Crown Publishers. He worked at CUNY from 1961 to 1988 and served as the executive editor of Crown Publishers from 1964 to 1974.

Publishing and writing career
Lyons wrote from the age of 26 to 36, when he was first published in Field & Stream magazine. He continued a successful writing career, composing many articles for a variety of publications and eleven books over the course of his time as a writer. In particular, he wrote a last-page column called the “Seasonable Angler” for Fly Fisherman magazine for over twenty years.

In 1977, Lyons acquired the rights to Art Flick's Streamside Guide, which inspired him to eventually create his first publishing company as a subsidiary of Benn Brothers, Ltd. In 1984, he bought out the subsidiary rights, and Nick Lyons Books became an independent incorporated company called Nick Lyons Books, Inc. The company initially focused on publishing books on fly fishing, but the list eventually expanded to include works on natural history, adventure, and a wide variety of outdoor activities. In 1981, Nick Lyons partnered with Peter Burford, and the publishing house became Lyons & Burford, Publishers. Lyons served as the president of the company for several years. In 1997, Peter Burford left the company, and its name changed again to the Lyons Press. In 1997, Lyons’ son Tony took over the company as the president and publisher. Nick remained as the chairman of the board. In 2001, Globe Pequot Press of Guilford, Connecticut acquired Lyons Press.

Personal life
In 1957, Lyons married artist Mari Blumenau. The two had four children: Paul (1958 - 2018), Charles, Jennifer, and Anthony (nicknamed Tony). Mari, who died in 2016, illustrated many of her husband's books and was a prolific artist.(www.marilyonsstudio.com)

Later years
Lyons now lives in New York City.

Publications
 Lyons, Nick. The Sony Vision. New York: Crown Publishers, 1976.
 Lyons, Nick. Confessions of a Fly Fishing Addict. New York: Simon & Schuster, 1989.
 Lyons, Nick. Bright Rivers. Philadelphia: J. B. Lippincott, 1977.
 Lyons, Nick. The Seasonable Angler. New York: Atlantic Monthly Press, 1999.
 Lyons, Nick. My Secret Fishing Life. New York: Atlantic Monthly Press, 1999.
 Lyons, Nick. A Flyfisher's World. New York: Atlantic Monthly Press, 1996.
 Lyons, Nick. Spring Creek. New York, NY: Atlantic Monthly Press, 1992.
 Lyons, Nick. 'Fire in the Straw: A Memoir.' New York, NY: Arcade Publishing, 2020.

References

External links 
 Nick Lyons Ephemera Collection at Montana State University

1932 births
People from Brooklyn
University of Michigan alumni
Living people